Ari Ankorion (born  2 October 1908 – 11 March 1986) was an Israeli politician and lawyer.

Biography
Ari Wolowitzky (later Ankorian) was born in Kalvarija in the Russian Empire. He attended a heder and a Hebrew science and technology school. He studied law at Vytautas Magnus University in Kaunas and was certified as a lawyer. While a student, he joined the Zionist Students Organisation in Kaunas. He was also a member of the Socialist Zionist Party and the League for a Workers Israel. In 1933, he made aliyah to Mandate Palestine.

He died in 1986 at the age of 77.

Legal and political career
After the move to Palestine, he worked as a lawyer in Jerusalem. Between 1934 and 1935, he was a member of the Mapai secretariat in the city. From 1936 until 1938, he was a London correspondent for Davar. Whilst in London he also attended the London School of Economics, gaining a PhD in philosophy. After returning to Palestine, he worked as a legal advisor for Hevrat Ovdim, the Histadrut's holding company, from 1940 until 1946.

He was on the Mapai list for the 1961 elections, and although he failed to win a seat, he entered the Knesset on 7 July 1965 as a replacement for the deceased Moshe Sharett. However, he lost his seat in the November 1965 elections. Nevertheless, he returned to the Knesset for a second time on 26 February 1969 as a replacement for Prime Minister Levi Eshkol, who had died in office. He was re-elected in the October 1969 elections, and again in 1973, before losing his seat for a final time in the 1977 elections.

References

External links

1908 births
1986 deaths
20th-century Israeli lawyers
20th-century journalists
Alignment (Israel) politicians
Alumni of the London School of Economics
Israeli journalists
Israeli lawyers
Israeli people of Lithuanian-Jewish descent
Jews from the Russian Empire
Lithuanian emigrants to Mandatory Palestine
Mandatory Palestine people of Lithuanian-Jewish descent
Mapai politicians
Members of the 5th Knesset (1961–1965)
Members of the 6th Knesset (1965–1969)
Members of the 7th Knesset (1969–1974)
Members of the 8th Knesset (1974–1977)
People from Kalvarija, Lithuania
Vytautas Magnus University alumni